Lake Tabanda (Tabanca) is a freshwater lake in the Moma District, Sakha Republic (Yakutia), Russia.   

It is one of the largest Alpine lakes of the Chersky Range system and is located in a desolate mountainous area where there are few visitors despite the beauty of the landscapes.

Geography
It is located at the head of the river in the northern slopes of the Chibagalakh Range. 

The Tabanda-Seene (Табанда-Сээнэ) river is the outflow of the lake. After its confluence with the Kanelibit, it gives origin to the Chibagalakh, a left hand tributary of the Indigirka.

See also
List of lakes of Russia
Chersky Range
Indigirka River

References

External links
Озеро Табанда (Lake Tabanda) 
Geographical places in Sakha (Yakutiya), Russia
Tabanda